"Ghaddara Ya Dounya" (Arabic: "غدارة يا دنيا", English: "Difficult Life") is a song by Lebanese singer Myriam Fares. It was released on June 3, 2021, in Fares's Netflix documentary, Myriam Fares: The Journey, and later on June 4, 2021, on YouTube by her own label Myriam Music. The song served as the lead single from her upcoming sixth studio album. It was written by her sister Rola Fares and was produced by Idriss Rouchiche.

Background 
In the documentary, Fares announced that every once in a while a song from the album will be released and not all at once due to the difficult situations that the world is going through, especially her country Lebanon. The song's official music video received 6 million views in the first week of its release.

Charts

References 

2021 songs
2021 singles
Myriam Fares songs